Valdas Balčiūnas (born 12 January 1969) is a Lithuanian sailor. He competed in the men's 470 event at the 1992 Summer Olympics.

References

External links
 

1969 births
Living people
Lithuanian male sailors (sport)
Olympic sailors of Lithuania
Sailors at the 1992 Summer Olympics – 470
Sportspeople from Kaunas